The hooktooth dogfish, Aculeola nigra, is a small, little-known dogfish, the only member of the genus Aculeola.

The type specimen is held at the National Natural History Museum, Santiago, Chile.

Description
The hooktooth dogfish has a blunt, flattened snout, very large eyes, a relatively long distance from the eye to the first gill slit, small grooved dorsal spines, a first dorsal fin about halfway between the pectoral and pelvic fins, and a broad caudal fin. They are black with a maximum length of only 60 cm.

Distribution
They are found in the eastern South Pacific along the coast of South America from Peru to central Chile.

Habits and habitat
This shark is a little-known, yet common, shark that lives at depths between 110 and 560 m. They are ovoviviparous, with at least three pups per litter. They probably eat bony fish and invertebrates.

References

 
 FAO Species Catalogue, Volume 4, Parts 1 and 2: Sharks of the World

External links
 Species Description of Aculeola nigra at www.shark-references.com

Etmopteridae
Fish described in 1959